Solenopotes is a genus of lice belonging to the family Linognathidae.

The species of this genus are found in Europe and Northern America.

Species:

Solenopotes binipilosus 
Solenopotes burmeisteri 
Solenopotes capillatus 
Solenopotes capreoli 
Solenopotes ferrisi 
Solenopotes hologastrus 
Solenopotes muntiacus 
Solenopotes natalensis 
Solenopotes tarandi

References

Lice